The 2015 Northeast Conference men's soccer season was the 35th season of men's varsity soccer in the conference.

The Saint Francis Red Flash are the defending regular season champions, while the St. Francis Brooklyn Terriers are the defending tournament champions.

LIU Brooklyn won the Regular Season Championship by going 7-0-0 in conference play and won the NEC tournament Championship by defeating St. Francis Brooklyn and Saint Francis (PA). Both tournament games were decided by penalty kicks. The NEC tournament was held in Brooklyn, NY at LIU Field.

Changes from 2014 

 None

Teams 

Notes:

All records, appearances, titles, etc. are from time with current school only.
Year at school includes 2015 season.
Overall and NEC records are from time at current school and are before the beginning of the season.

Regular season

Rankings

Results

All-NEC awards and teams

Postseason

NEC tournament

 
 

 (†) The LIU-SFBK game was tied 1–1 after double overtime and LIU won on penalty kicks 4–3.
 (#) The LIU-SFU game was tied 2–2 after double overtime and LIU won on penalty kicks 3–1.

NCAA tournament

References 

 
2015 NCAA Division I men's soccer season